is a traditional Acadian dish that in its most common form consists of a boiled potato dumpling with a pork filling; it is usually prepared with a mixture of grated and mashed potato.

Some versions of the dish call for the dumpling to be boiled on its own for several hours.

Because of the time it takes to prepare , it is generally regarded as a special occasion meal, especially popular during the holidays. White or brown sugar, maple syrup or fruit preserves may accompany the dish.

Etymology
The origin of the term poutine is unclear, but it might be a bastardisation of "pudding"; râpé, -e is French for "grated". Therefore,  could be literally translated as "grated pudding".

See also

Klöße
Cepelinai
Kroppkaka
Palt
Raspeball
Pyzy

References

External links
 Acadian Heritage Portal  – Video and historical facts on the Acadian Poutine râpée

Acadian cuisine
Potato dishes
Dumplings